Charles Arthur "Doc" Dudley, Jr, (January 10, 1894 – January 24, 1975) was an American baseball outfielder in the Negro leagues. He played from 1920 to 1923 with the St. Louis Giants and the St. Louis Stars .

References

External links
 and Seamheads

1894 births
1975 deaths
St. Louis Giants players
St. Louis Stars (baseball) players
People from Waskom, Texas
20th-century African-American sportspeople
Baseball outfielders